North Carolina Highway 146 (NC 146) is a short east/west state highway in western North Carolina and lies entirely in Buncombe County, south of downtown Asheville.  It is named Long Shoals Road for its entire length.

Route description
NC 146 begins its western end at NC 191 in the community of Avery Creek a census-designated place (CDP) south of Asheville. Passing exit 37, NC 146 enters the Asheville city limits and passes north of Lake Julian and Julian Lake Park before nearing its eastern end. At , NC 146 reaches its eastern end at U.S. Route 25 in Skyland (but still within the Asheville city limits).

History
The current routing of NC 146 was designated around 1991 as a renumbering of North Carolina Highway 280. NC 280 was rerouted at NC 191 to head directly east to U.S. Route 25. As a result, the former routing of NC 280 from NC 191 to Skyland became NC 146.

Major Intersections

References

146
Transportation in Buncombe County, North Carolina